Charing Beech Hangers is a  biological Site of Special Scientific Interest north of Ashford in Kent.

This steeply sloping site has mature beech and oak, and the ground flora is varied with some uncommon species. Invertebrates include the rare slug limax tenellus and several scarce moths.

The North Downs Way runs along the south side of the site.

References

Sites of Special Scientific Interest in Kent